David Andrew Brookwell (born February 6, 1961 in Morristown, New Jersey) is an American  television and film producer, writer and director.

Brookwell is the co-founder of Brookwell McNamara Entertainment with longtime partner Sean McNamara. Brookwell and McNamara are best known for their work in the "tween" television and film market.

Television credits
The Secret World of Alex Mack (1994-1998)
Even Stevens (2000-2003)
That's So Raven (2003-2006)
Just for Kicks (2006)
Beyond the Break (2006-2009)
Dance Revolution (2006-2007)
Cake (2006)
Out of Jimmy's Head (2007-2008)

Filmography
Time Travel: Fact, Fiction and Fantasy (1985)
Hollywood Chaos (1989)
Permanent Midnight (1998)
Treehouse Hostage (1999)
Race to Space (2001)
The Even Stevens Movie (2003)
Raise Your Voice (2004)
The Cutting Edge: Going for the Gold (2006)
McKids Adventures: Treasure Hunt with Ronald (2006)
McKids Adventures: Get Up and Go with Ronald (2006)
Into the Blue 2: The Reef (2009)
Bring It On: Fight to the Finish (2009)
Soul Surfer (2011)
Christ Revealed (2017)
Mighty Oak (2020)
The King's Daughter (2022)

References

External links

David Brookwell Bio
Brookwell/McNamara Entertainment

1961 births
Film producers from New Jersey
American television directors
American television writers
American male television writers
Living people
People from Morristown, New Jersey
Brookwell McNamara Entertainment
Screenwriters from New Jersey
Television producers from New Jersey